Chenappady is a small village on the foothills of the Sahyadri of Kerala, in the banks of Manimala River. Chenappady is located near to Kanjirappally, Manimala, Ponkunnam and Erumely.CHENAPPADY KIZHAKKEKKARA SREE BHAGAVATHY TEMPLE IS THE OLDEST TEMPLE IN THIS VILLAGE.IT WAS ESTABLISHED BY THE THEKKUMKOOR DYNASTY IN AD 1100. Sri Dharma Shastha temple is another famous Ayyappa temple located in Chenappady. Sabarimala temple is 65 km far from Chenappady. The rumoured Aerodrome in Erumely will be 6 Km from the Chenappady junction.
There are 5 temples, 1 RC church, St Stephens CSI Church and 2 mosques.

During Aranmula Valla Sadya, Curd from Chenappady were supplied to Aranmula Parthasarathy Temple.

Bank and Atms

There is one private bank (catholicate syrian bank) and one Atm (SBI) located in junction premises. 

Vehicles are registered under SRTO Kanjirappally (KL-34)

Schools and Colleges :

1) Govt LP School Alumood Chenappady

2) Govt NSS UP School Chenappady

3) RV Govt VHSS Vizhikkathod Chenappady

4) Santhom Public School Chenappady

5) St.Michael's U.P School Pazhayidom Chenappady

6) St. Antony's, Tharakanattukunnu

7) Hindustan College of Pharmacy, Chenappady

References

Villages in Kottayam district
Changanassery